Dr. Homi Bhabha State University (HBSU) is a state university located in Mumbai, Maharashtra, India. It was established in 2019 as a cluster university, combining four colleges formerly under the University of Mumbai — Elphinstone College, Sydenham College, Secondary Training College and The Institute of Science, the latter being the main college.

References 

Universities and colleges in Maharashtra
Mumbai
2019 establishments in Maharashtra
Educational institutions established in 2019